The Departments of the Central Committee of the Communist Party of the Soviet Union were all specialised in their own field, for example, the International Department handled Soviet relations with non-ruling communist parties.

Key
 A–U is an abbreviation of All-Union, in this case All-Union Ministries.  The All-Union ministries were ministries with no regional ministerial branches in the republics.
 U–R is an abbreviation of Union Republic, in this case Union republican ministries.  Union republican ministries were either All-Union ministries with republican branches or republican ministries without an All-Union affiliate. 
 Pres. is short for Presidium, in this case Presidium of the Council of Ministers. In the tables. Pres. denotes ministers or chairmen of state committees who held seats in the Presidium.

Departments

Central Committee of the Communist Party of the Soviet Union